Folger is a surname.

It may also refer to:
 Cape Folger, a cape on the Budd Coast of Antarctica
 Folger Coffee Company Building, an office building in San Francisco, California, U.S.
 Folger Estate Stable Historic District, a historic district in Woodside, California, U.S.
 Folger Park, a park in Washington, D.C., U.S.
 Folger Rock, a rock in Nelson Island, Antarctica

See also
 Folgers
 Foulger